Tansen Samaroh or Tansen Sangeet Samaroh is celebrated every year in the month of December in Behat village of Gwalior district, Madhya Pradesh. It is a 4-day musical extravaganza. Artists and music lovers from all over the world gather here to pay tribute to the Great Indian Musical Maestro Tansen. The event is organized near the tomb of Tansen by Ustad Alauddin Khan Kala Evam Sangeet  Academy, under the department of culture, Government of Madhya Pradesh. Artists from all over India are invited to deliver vocal and instrumental performances.

National Music festival 
Tansen Samaroh was originally a local festival but it was at the initiative of BV Keskar (1983 – 28 August 1984), who was Union Minister for Information and Broadcasting between 1952 and 1962, that Tansen Samaroh was turned into a popular national music festival.

Tansen Samman
The 'National Tansen Samman' is a musical award conferred to the exponents

See also

List of Indian classical music festivals
Hindustani classical music
Carnatic classical music
Gwalior
Madhya Pradesh

References

External links

Hindustani classical music festivals
Music festivals in India
Festivals in Madhya Pradesh
Gwalior district